The 1958 United States Senate elections in Alaska were held November 25, 1958. The elections were held in anticipation of Alaska's admission as the forty-ninth State in the union, effective January 3, 1959. The state held two simultaneous elections to determine their first senators.

Both elections were won by the Democratic Party. The new Senators, Bob Bartlett and Ernest Gruening, were sworn into office alongside those Senators elected in the 1958 United States Senate elections held three weeks earlier.

Class 2

This election was for the class 2 term expiring in 1961. It was won by Democrat Bob Bartlett.

Democratic primary

Candidates
Bob Bartlett, Territorial Delegate at-large to the U.S. House of Representatives

Results
Delegate Bartlett was unopposed for the Democratic nomination.

Republican primary

Candidates
R. E. Robertson, attorney and former Mayor of Juneau

Results
Robertson was unopposed for the Republican nomination.

General election

Results

Class 3

This election was for the class 3 term expiring in 1963. It was won by Democrat Ernest Gruening.

General election

Candidates
Ernest Gruening, former Territorial Governor (1939–53) (Democratic)
Mike Stepovich, incumbent Territorial Governor (Republican)

Results

References

1958
Alaska
United States Senate